The Worshipful Company of Girdlers is one of the Livery Companies of the City of London.

Girdlers were granted the right to regulate their trade in the City from 1327 and obtained a Royal Charter in 1449. Girdlers, or makers of belts and girdles, are no longer closely related to their original trade. Along with the products of many other Livery Companies, girdles have become of less importance than in medieval times. However, the Company continues its long tradition as a charitable body.

The Girdlers' Company ranks twenty-third in the order of precedence of City Livery Companies. The Company's motto is Give Thanks To God.

See also 
Girdler's carpet

References

External links
Worshipful Company of Girdlers' website
www.londongardensonline.org.uk

1327 establishments in England
Livery companies
Companies of medieval England
Charities based in London
Clothing companies based in London